The Barber of Seville (Italian: Il barbiere di Siviglia) is a 1947 Italian opera film directed by Mario Costa and starring Ferruccio Tagliavini, Tito Gobbi and Nelly Corradi. It is an adaptation of Gioachino Rossini's 1816 opera The Barber of Seville.

Plot

Cast
 Ferruccio Tagliavini as Count Almaviva  
 Tito Gobbi as Figaro  
 Nelly Corradi as Rosina  
 Vito De Taranto as Don Bartolo  
 Italo Tajo as Don Basilio  
 Natalia Nicolini as Berta  
 Nino Mazziotti as Fiorello

See also
 The Barber of Seville, 1775 play

References

Bibliography 
 Brunetta, Gian Piero. The History of Italian Cinema: A Guide to Italian Film from Its Origins to the Twenty-first Century.  Princeton University Press, 2009.

External links 

1947 films
Films based on operas
Italian musical comedy films
1947 musical comedy films
1940s Italian-language films
Films directed by Mario Costa
Films set in Seville
Films set in the 18th century
Films based on The Barber of Seville
Italian black-and-white films
Opera films
1940s Italian films